Quiero Amanecer con Alguien (English I want to wake up with someone) is the 6th studio album by Mexican pop singer Daniela Romo.

History
This was the first album produced by Bebu Silvetti and K.C. Porter for Daniela. This was a meaningful change in her career, she finished recording the albums with a style of the 1980s and started with an era of romantic ballads, with a fresher and newer sound.

Track listing
Tracks:
 Quiero amanecer con alguien
 La última en tu vida
 Explórame
 Nada me falta nada me sobra
 Balada por un amor
 Una vez más
 Y cae la gota de agua
 Solo siempre tú
 Dímelo
 Desnuda
 La Guirnalda

Singles
 Quiero amanecer con alguien
 Dímelo
 Explórame
 Balada por un amor

Singles charts
"Quiero amanecer con alguien" reached #2 on Hot Latin Songs.
"Dímelo" reached #3 on Hot Latin Songs.
"Explórame" reached #4 on Hot Latin Songs.
"balada por un amor"reached #15 on Hot Latin Songs

Album chart
This was the first album of Daniela to hit the #1 in Billboard Latin Pop Albums staying for 5 non-consecutive weeks.

See also
List of number-one Billboard Latin Pop Albums from the 1990s

References

1989 albums
Daniela Romo albums
Albums produced by Bebu Silvetti
Albums produced by K. C. Porter